William Stephen Chandler (August 27, 1895 – May 23, 1953) was an American basketball and baseball coach.  He served as the head basketball coach at River Falls State Normal School—now known as the University of Wisconsin–River Falls—from 1919 to 1921, Iowa State University from 1921 to 1928, and Marquette University from 1930 to 1951, compiling a career college basketball coaching record of 260–290.  Chandler was also the head baseball coach at Iowa State from 1923 to 1928, tallying a mark of 41–50.

Biography

Early life
Chandler played basketball at the University of Wisconsin–Madison and was a center on the 1915–16 and 1917–18 teams, both of which finished in first place in the Big Ten Conference.

Coaching career
Chandler's first head coaching job was at the University of Wisconsin–River Falls.  During his two seasons (1919–21), he compiled a 27–7 record.

Chandler coached at Iowa State for seven seasons (1921–28) and later coached Marquette basketball for 21 seasons (1930–51). His 193 victories are second all-time behind Al McGuire. Chandler was president of the National Association of Basketball Coaches in 1938 and was instrumental in forming the NCAA basketball tournament. His best years came in 1932–33 when he directed the squad to a mark of 14–3 and in the following campaign when Marquette compiled a 15–4 record. He died of a heart attack in 1953.

Awards
Chandler is a member of Marquette University's M Club Hall of Fame.

In 2018, Chandler was inducted into Wisconsin's UW Athletics Hall of Fame.

Head coaching record

Basketball

References

1895 births
1953 deaths
All-American college men's basketball players
American men's basketball players
Basketball coaches from Illinois
Basketball players from Chicago
Centers (basketball)
Iowa State Cyclones baseball coaches
Iowa State Cyclones men's basketball coaches
Marquette Golden Eagles men's basketball coaches
Sportspeople from Chicago
Wisconsin Badgers men's basketball coaches
Wisconsin Badgers men's basketball players
Wisconsin–River Falls Falcons men's basketball coaches